WCUP is a Country formatted broadcast radio station licensed to L'Anse, Michigan, serving the Keweenaw Peninsula.  WCUP is owned and operated by Keweenaw Bay Indian Community.

References

External links
 Eagle Country 105.7 Online
 

CUP
Radio stations established in 1998
Country radio stations in the United States
Native American radio
Ojibwe culture